Events from the year 1948 in France.

Incumbents
President: Vincent Auriol 
President of the Council of Ministers: 
 until 24 July: Robert Schuman 
 24 July-2 September: André Marie 
 2 September-11 September: Robert Schuman
 starting 11 September: Henri Queuille

Events
17 March – Treaty of Brussels, is signed by Belgium, France, Luxembourg, the Netherlands and the United Kingdom, aimed mainly at defending against possible German rearmament.
5 September – Robert Schuman becomes Prime Minister of France.
7 October – Citroën 2CV economy car introduced at the Paris Motor Show.

Sport
30 June – Tour de France begins.
25 July – Tour de France ends, won by Gino Bartali of Italy.

Births
17 February – Philippe Khorsand, actor (died 2008)
10 March – Jean-Pierre Adams, international soccer player (died 2021)
11 March – Dominique Sanda, actress
9 April – Bernard-Marie Koltès, playwright and director (died 1989)
30 July – Jean Reno, actor
3 August – Jean-Pierre Raffarin, former Prime Minister of France
8 October – Claude Jade, actress (died 2006)
27 December – Gérard Depardieu, actor
Full date unknown:
 Bernard Drubay, sailor

Deaths
7 January – Jean-Baptiste Chabot, priest and Syriac scholar (born 1860)
15 January – Henri-Alexandre Deslandres, astronomer (born 1853)
12 February – Caroline Lacroix, courtesan (born 1883)
4 March 
Antonin Artaud, dramatist, poet, actor and director (born 1896; cancer)
Lucien Rouzet, physicist and inventor (born 1886)
12 March – Antoine Lacroix, mineralogist and geologist (born 1863)
5 July – Georges Bernanos, author (born 1888)
6 July – René de Labarrière, first UN soldier killed in action (born 1899; killed by landmine)
31 July – Georges Blondel, historian (born 1856)
25 September – Pierre Frondaie, poet, novelist and playwright (born 1884)
11 October – André Bloch, mathematician (born 1893; leukaemia)

See also
 List of French films of 1948

References

1940s in France